Austria competed at the FIS Alpine World Ski Championships 1933 in Innsbruck, Austria, from 6 to 10 February 1933.

Medalists

Results

Men

Women

References

External links
 Austrian Ski Federation 

Nations at the FIS Alpine World Ski Championships 1933
Alpine World Ski Championships
Austria at the FIS Alpine World Ski Championships